Copacabana is a 1985 American made-for-television musical film based on the 1978 song of the same title by Barry Manilow, and starred Manilow himself, in his acting debut, as Tony, an aspiring songwriter, and Annette O'Toole as Lola, an aspiring singer who falls in with the wrong crowd.

The film premiered on CBS on December 3, 1985. At the 38th Primetime Emmy Awards, the film was nominated for Outstanding Achievement in Choreography (Grover Dale) and Outstanding Directing in a Variety or Music Program (Hussein), and won for the latter.

A soundtrack album, Copacabana: The Original Motion Picture Soundtrack Album, was released. The film also inspired a 1990 stage show at Caesars Atlantic City, as well as a 1994 musical of the same name.

Plot 
The film's story is told in flashbacks from 1978 to 1948, and back again. In 1978, a woman named Lola Lamar patronizes the Copacabana lounge in Manhattan, which in that year was being operated as a discotheque. There, outfitted in worn wardrobe that was new in the middle-to-late 1940s, when she had originally obtained it, she drinks rather heavily and remembers happier days thirty years ago, when she was far younger.

In 1948, wannabe singer Lola meets aspiring songwriter Tony Starr when both are contestants on a radio show. Tony is immediately smitten with Lola and assists her flailing attempts to break into show business. At Manhattan's Copacabana lounge, both start finding fame. However, fate steps in and Lola is swept to Havana to work in a splashy night club act where she is convinced she will find her stardom, while Tony finds his own career gaining speed at the Copa. But Lola's new mentor and boss, Rico Castelli, demands a heavy price for elevating Lola's career, resulting in conflict, drama and eventually Tony's accidental murder at Lola's hands, during a battle for the gun.

The setting returns to 1978 after the depiction of Tony's accidental murder at Lola's hands. The now-aged Lola, thoroughly drunk, has a vision of a younger version of herself and Tony dancing on the dancefloor.

Cast
 Barry Manilow as Tony Starr 
 Annette O'Toole as Lola Lamar
 Estelle Getty as Bella Stern
 James T. Callahan as Dennis Riley
 Andra Akers as Pamela Devereaux
 Silvana Gallardo as Conchita Alverez
 Joseph Bologna as Rico Castelli
 Ernie Sabella as Sam Silver
 Cliff Osmond as Algelo
 Dwier Brown as Bibi Sutton
 Hamilton Camp as Nicky Richards
 Stanley Brock as 2nd Publisher
 Clarence Felder as Nick Panotis
 Artie Butler as Nightclub Piano Player

Production 
Dick Clark approached Manilow and cowriters Bruce Sussman and Jack Feldman, persuading them to develop a musical film around the song. Directed by Waris Hussein and written by James Lipton, the film features a handful of newly composed songs by Manilow.

Music 

The soundtrack album was released by RCA Records.

Nine songs were written specifically for the film.
 "Sweet Heaven (I'm in Love Again)" - Tony
 "Changing My Tune" - Tony
 "Let's Go Steppin'" - Copa Girls
 "Man Wanted" - Lola
 "Call Me Mr. Lucky" - Tony
 "Lola" - Tony
 "Who Needs to Dream?" - Tony
 "¡Aye Caramba!" - Copa Girls
 "El Bravo" - Lola

References

External links
 

Barry Manilow
1985 television films
1985 films
American musical films
1980s American films
1980s musical films
Films based on songs
Films set in 1948
Films set in New York City
Films directed by Waris Hussein
CBS network films